Winston Rose (born November 29, 1993) is a professional gridiron football defensive back for the Winnipeg Blue Bombers of the Canadian Football League (CFL). Rose won the 107th Grey Cup with the Blue Bombers when they beat the Hamilton Tiger-Cats 33–12. He played NCAA football for the New Mexico State Aggies.

Professional career

Los Angeles Rams
Rose was originally signed as an undrafted free agent by the Los Angeles Rams of the National Football League (NFL) in May 2016, but was released shortly after.

Indianapolis Colts
After his release, Rose signed with the Indianapolis Colts. He played in three pre-season games with the Colts, but was released.

Toronto Argonauts
Rose then signed by the Toronto Argonauts to their practice roster on September 19, 2016. He was re-signed during the following off-season and began the 2017 season on the Argonauts' practice roster.

Ottawa Redblacks
He was released in July. Shortly after his release, Rose signed to the Ottawa Redblacks' practice roster on July 24, 2017.

Rose played in his first professional regular season game on September 29, 2017, against the Saskatchewan Roughriders where he recorded five defensive tackles. He was re-signed by the Redblacks after the end of the season, only to be released by the team on March 7, 2018.

BC Lions
He was then signed by the BC Lions on March 9, 2018, and played in all 18 games that season and recorded 32 defensive tackles and five interceptions. Rose became a free agent following the season's end.

Winnipeg Blue Bombers
In the offseason, Rose signed with the Winnipeg Blue Bombers on February 13, 2019. He played and started in all 18 regular season games, recording 58 defensive tackles and a league-leading nine interceptions, returning one for his first career touchdown. For his dominant season, he was named a West Division All-Star and CFL All-Star for the first time in his career.

Cincinnati Bengals

On December 31, 2019, Rose signed a reserve/future contract with the Cincinnati Bengals of the NFL. He was waived on September 5, 2020, and signed to the practice squad the next day. He was elevated to the active roster on October 24 for the team's week 7 game against the Cleveland Browns, and reverted to the practice squad after the game. He was placed on the practice squad/COVID-19 list by the team on November 11, and activated back to the practice squad on November 25. He was elevated to the active roster again for the week 17 game against the Baltimore Ravens, and reverted to the practice squad again following the game. He signed a reserve/future contract on January 4, 2021.

On August 31, 2021, Rose was waived by the Bengals and re-signed to the practice squad the next day. He was released on September 6.

Winnipeg Blue Bombers
On October 20, 2021, it was announced that Rose had re-signed with the Winnipeg Blue Bombers.

Statistics

CFL

References

External links

Winnipeg Blue Bombers bio

1993 births
Living people
American football defensive backs
Canadian football defensive backs
Players of American football from Inglewood, California
New Mexico State Aggies football players
Los Angeles Rams players
Indianapolis Colts players
Toronto Argonauts players
Ottawa Redblacks players
BC Lions players
Winnipeg Blue Bombers players
Los Angeles Valley Monarchs football players
Cincinnati Bengals players